Hold Your Breath may refer to:

 Hold Your Breath (album), an album by Embodyment
 Hold Your Breath (1924 film), an American silent comedy film
 Hold Your Breath (2012 film), an American supernatural horror film
 "Hold Your Breath" (song), a song by A Loss for Words